Nikolay Demirev is an American bridge player.

Bridge accomplishments

Wins

 North American Bridge Championships (5)
 North American Pairs (1) 2005 
 Lebhar IMP Pairs (2) 2004, 2009 
 Nail Life Master Open Pairs (1) 2008 
 Wernher Open Pairs (1) 2009

Runners-up

 North American Bridge Championships (2)
 North American Pairs (1) 2010 
 von Zedtwitz Life Master Pairs (1) 2009

Notes

American contract bridge players